Eobisan  is a mountain in Gyeonggi-do, South Korea. Its area extends across Yangpyeong County and Gapyeong County.

See also
List of mountains in Korea

Notes

References

Mountains of Gyeonggi Province
Yangpyeong County
Gapyeong County
Mountains of South Korea